The defending champion was Elena Baltacha, but she did not compete this year.

Lucie Hradecká defeated Irina Falconi, 6–4, 6–4.

Seeds

Draw

Finals

Top half

Bottom half

External links
 Main Draw
 Qualifying Draw

Dow Corning Tennis Classic - Singles
Dow Corning Tennis Classic